Carmen Sánchez Levi (7 December 1931 – 13 February 2018), known as Carmela Rey, was a Mexican singer and actress.

One of the last official vocalists of Agustín Lara, she became famous in the 1950s as a soloist on radio and television programs, and recorded exclusively for Musart Records and later for RCA Records. In movies, she had starring roles in A sablazo limpio (1958), Viva la parranda (1960), Las hijas del Amapolo (1962), and Escuela para solteras (1965).

With her husband, singer Rafael Vázquez, she formed a duet named Carmela y Rafael, "The Romantic Couple of Mexico", which was hugely successful in the 1960s and 1970s.

Life and career
Carmela Rey was born in Xalapa, the capital of Veracruz, Mexico. Her parents were Vicente Sánchez Rebolledo and Dinah Levi Rey. She took her stage name from her maternal grandmother, Isabel Rey. Carmela finished her primary and secondary school in Mexico City, and learned solfège, harmony, history of music, and Italian at the Conservatorio Nacional de Música. She was also a student of the famous Mexican contralto Fanny Anitúa.

Rey began her career participating in recitals at Mexico City's Palacio de Bellas Artes, but she married and went abroad to live with her husband. She made a comeback singing in her own radio programs and performing at the posh Capri nightclub in Mexico City. Rey also made her television debut, and one of her TV programs remained on the air for 26 consecutive weeks. Her popularity spread to other Latin American countries, including Cuba, Colombia and Venezuela.

Her great beauty and natural charm attracted the attention of film producers Óscar J. Brooks and Ernesto Enríquez, who signed her for the female lead opposite Viruta y Capulina and Chilean bolero singer Lucho Gatica in A sablazo limpio (1958), a comedy set in the Spanish empire of the 18th century.

Rey also made musical appearances in La mujer marcada (1957) and Mi mujer necesita marido (1959), and played one of the leading roles in Yo pecador (1959), a biopic of Mexican tenor-turned-priest José Mojica. These performances were followed by three more starring roles, in the films Viva la parranda (1960), with Miguel Aceves Mejía, Lucho Gatica and Guillermina Téllez Girón; Las hijas del Amapolo (1962), with José Elías Moreno, Lucha Moreno, María Eugenia Rubio and Angélica María; and Escuela para solteras (1965), with Flor Silvestre, Fanny Cano, Alma Delia Fuentes, Lucha Moreno and Sara García.

Death
Rey died at around 9:00 am on 13 February 2018 in Mexico City. She was 86 years old. Her grandson revealed the cause of her death to be "a heart attack and she was asleep, so when we found her she was in her bed; and although she suffered from hypertension this was not the cause of her death". Her husband, who is in delicate health, was not able to attend her funeral service. Her remains were cremated on 14 February.

Discography
 Carmela Rey con las orquestas de José Sabre Marroquín y Enrico Cabiati (Musart M270)
 Carmela Rey interpreta a Agustín Lara (Musart D369)
 Carmela Rey - Agustín Lara (RCA Víctor MKL-1600)
 Amar y vivir (Musart 1564)
 Los hits de Carmela Rey

Filmography

References

External links
 Carmela Rey discography and album reviews, credits & releases at AllMusic
 Carmela Rey discography, album releases & credits at Discogs
 
 Carmela Rey albums to be listened on Spotify
 Carmela Rey albums to be listened on YouTube

1931 births
2018 deaths
People from Xalapa
Bolero singers
Singers from Veracruz
20th-century Mexican actresses
Mexican film actresses
Actresses from Veracruz
Mexican mezzo-sopranos
20th-century Mexican women singers
Musart Records artists